Mingyi Nyo (also spelled Minkyi-nyo; ; 1459–1530) was the founder of the Toungoo dynasty of Burma (Myanmar). Under his 45-year leadership (1485–1530), Toungoo (Taungoo), grew from a remote backwater vassal state of Ava Kingdom to a small but stable independent kingdom. In 1510, he declared Toungoo's independence from its nominal overlord Ava. He skillfully kept his small kingdom out of the chaotic warfare plaguing Upper Burma. Toungoo's stability continued to attract refugees from Ava fleeing the repeated raids of Ava by the Confederation of Shan States (1490s–1527). Nyo left a stable, confident kingdom that enabled his successor Tabinshwehti to contemplate taking on larger kingdoms on his way to founding the Toungoo Empire.

Early life
Mingyi Nyo was born to Maha Thinkhaya and Min Hla Nyet. His father was a descendant of Kyawswa I of Pinya, who himself was a descendant of kings Narathihapate of Bagan and Thihathu of Pinya. His mother was a daughter of Viceroy Sithu Kyawhtin of Toungoo, a descendant of King Swa Saw Ke.

Nyo was most likely born in Ava (Inwa) as his maternal grandfather Sithu Kyawhtin did not become viceroy until 1470, and prior to 1470 served at King Thihathura I's court at Ava. He was born in 1459. He was likely about eleven or twelve years old when his entire family moved to Toungoo with Sithu Kyawhtin's appointment as viceroy. After Sithu Kyawhtin's death in 1481, his eldest son Min Sithu inherited the viceroyship. (The viceroyships in that era were hereditary, and were a primary cause of endemic rebellions that plagued Ava. The Restored Toungoo kings (1599–1752) would later eliminate the hereditary rights of viceroys.) Nyo wanted to marry his first cousin, Soe Min Hteik-Tin. But because his uncle Min Sithu repeatedly rejected Nyo's numerous requests, he murdered his uncle, took his cousin as wife. He seized power in  April 1485.

Reign
After assassinating his uncle and seizing the viceroyship, Nyo sent a present of two young elephants to King Minkhaung II of Ava. In normal times, killing a governor was a serious crime. But Minkhaung II was facing a serious rebellion nearer to Ava (by his brother Minye Kyawswa of Yamethin)–Prome farther south had already revolted in 1482–did not want another rebellion. He gave Nyo recognition as governor of Toungoo, and solicited Toungoo's help in the rebellions. Nyo also received recognition from Hanthawaddy and Lan Na, and received propitiatory tribute from the Karenni.

Loyal vassal of Ava (1485–1501)
Mingyi Nyo, now styled as Thiri Zeya Thura, eagerly assisted Ava in its fight against Yamethin. (His grandfather Sithu Kyawhtin died in 1481 fighting against the Yamethin rebels.) Even with Toungoo's help, the Yamethin rebellion was intractable and remained a stalemate. (It would remain so until Minye Kyawswa's death in August 1500). With Ava chiefly preoccupied by Yamethin, Nyo grew more confident and on 11 November 1491 built a new fortified city called Dwayawaddy (still near Toungoo), at the estuary of the rivers Kabaung and Paunglaung.

Nyo soon tested his power by meddling into the accession affairs of Hanthawaddy Kingdom, the much larger kingdom to the south. In 1491–1492, Hanthawaddy's new king Binnya Ran II came to power by killing off all the royal offspring. Taking advantage of the chaos in the southern kingdom, Nyo sent a probing raid into the territory of Hanthawaddy without Minkhaung II's permission. At Kaungbya, he killed its Shan governor in single combat by jumping onto his elephant and cutting him down. Hanthawaddy's response was swift. In late 1495, Binnya Ran II sent in a combined land and naval force of 16,000, which ultimately laid siege to the new built Dwayawaddy itself. Toungoo barely survived the siege but Nyo would not make war against the larger neighbor for the remainder of his life.

Minkhaung II nonetheless upgraded Nyo's title to Maha Thiri Zeya Thura for surviving the Hanthawaddy attack (although it was Nyo who without his permission provoked the attack). Minkhaung had little choice but to retain Nyo as he was one of the remaining loyal vassals of Ava. In return, Toungoo participated Ava's campaigns against Yamethin and Prome for the remainder of the 1490s.

Nominal vassal of Ava (1501–1510)
By the turn of the 16th century, Nyo's Toungoo was equally powerful as its nominal overlord Ava. Nyo, though still loyal to Minkhaung, nonetheless accepted about a thousand Yamethin rebels, who fled to Toungoo after their leader died in August 1500. When Minkhaung II also died in April 1501, Nyo was ready to assert his independence. He readily gave shelter to those who attempted on the life of the new king Shwenankyawshin.

Despite Nyo's thinly veiled insurrection, the new king wanted to retain Toungoo's loyalty as he faced a new even more pressing problem of Shan raids from the north. In 1502, he bribed Nyo by giving him his first cousin Min Hla Htut (styled as Thiri Maha Sanda Dewi) for marriage and the Kyaukse granary, the most valuable region in Upper Burma. Nyo accepted the region, and deported much of the population between Kyaukse and Toungoo–Yamethin, Meiktila, etc.–to his capital. But not only did he not provide any help to Ava but he actively joined in the rebellions by the princes of Nyaungyan and Prome. Together with the rebel forces, he raided far north as Sale. In 1509, Taungdwingyi also came under his authority.

Independence from Ava (1510–1530)
In 1510, he founded Ketumati, the present-day Toungoo, complete with fortified walls. On 16 October 1510 (Full moon of Tazaungmon 872 ME) Nyo formally announced Toungoo's independence. At his coronation ceremony on 11 April 1511, he was crowned king with the regnal title of Maha Thiri Zeya Thura Dhamma Yaza Dipadi. Ava was in no position to contest the decision, as it had more pressing problems with the Shan raids from the north. At any rate, the announcement was a mere formality. Toungoo had been de facto independent since 1501. After the formal declaration of independence, Nyo largely stayed out of the endemic warfare between Ava and the Confederation of Shan States that consumed much of Upper Burma between 1501 and 1527. When Ava was on the ropes, he did move up his forward base to Yamethin and Taungdwingyi, former Ava territories, on 15 March 1523 (New Moon of Tabaung 884 ME). Ava responded by unsuccessfully laying siege to Toungoo for a month in April–May 1525. Otherwise, the kingdom was largely peaceful.

When the Confederation finally defeated Ava in March 1527, Nyo deliberately devastated the countryside between Ava and Toungoo, filling the wells and breaking down the channels in the hope of making an impassable belt between Toungoo and the Confederation. The Burmese bureaucracy and population at Ava largely fled to Toungoo.

Mingyi Nyo died on 24 November 1530, and was succeeded by his son Tabinshweti.

Legacy
Mingyi Nyo's 45-year reign was one of the few stable regimes in Upper Burma in the era. Toungoo's remote location (nestled between the Bago Yoma mountain range and the Karen Hill country, and cut off from the main Irrawaddy river valley) proved a vital advantage. It took effort to march to Toungoo. The stability of his kingdom attracted many refugees, and the flow of refugees accelerated after Ava's fall. The increased manpower allowed Tabinshwehti and his deputy Bayinnaung to imagine an offensive war against larger kingdoms. Tabinshwehti's improbable victory over Hanthawaddy had its beginnings in Mingyi Nyo's long stable rule.

Notes

References

Bibliography
 
 
 
 
 
 

Monarchs of Toungoo dynasty
Rulers of Toungoo
1459 births
1530 deaths
16th-century Burmese monarchs